Padalarang–Cileunyi Toll Road or Padaleunyi is an expressway located in Bandung, West Java. It is a part of the Purbaleunyi Toll Road (Purwakarta-Bandung-Cileunyi) connecting Cileunyi, Bandung Regency with Purwakarta and onwards to Jakarta. This particular segment of the toll road bypasses the city of Bandung and is also used for local transportation between locations passed.

Description 
This toll road was constructed between 1989 and 1992. It is amongst the oldest toll road constructed in Indonesia. For years this toll road stands unconnected, until 2005 when construction of the Cipularang Toll Road was finished, connecting this toll road to the Jakarta-Cikampek Toll Road. A new toll road is under construction from the current terminus of Cileunyi towards the northeast with the goal of connecting this toll road to the Cikopo-Palimanan Toll Road with an expected completion date of 2023.

This toll road begins at the Padalarang interchange, the site of the intersection of roadways towards Jakarta via Puncak, Purwakarta, and Bandung. The interchange also marks the end of the Cipularang Toll Road. From there, the toll road passes through the southern side of Bandung, mostly running parallel with (although placing more southern) the conventional Bandung bypass (more commonly known as the Soekarno-Hatta road or Soetta after the founding fathers of Indonesia). The terminus of this toll road is located at the Cileunyi interchange, near the Bandung city boundary, where it continues as the Cisumdawu Toll Road. This terminus also leads towards the road heading towards the southern coast of Java via Garut, Tasikmalaya, Banjar and onwards, considered one of the most important roadways of the country.

This toll road also runs parallel with the Jakarta-Bandung High Speed Rail from Gedebage to the border between Cimahi and West Bandung where it splits, heading towards the existing railway line.

As the toll road bypasses downtown Bandung, it is also often used by local travellers, especially those working and living in the surrounding areas.

Currently, the toll road also links Bandung (and also points northwest such as Jakarta) towards popular holiday destinations such as Ciwidey (via the Soreang-Pasirkoja Toll Road), Puncak, and Lembang (via conventional roads). As such this toll road often gets congested, especially during the weekends or national holidays.

This toll road is not considered as part of the Trans-Java Toll Road network, although it is considered an auxiliary route.

Exits

Pasteur Link

Rest Area

References

Toll roads in Java
Transport in West Java
Bandung